The fourth season of the German singing competition The Masked Singer premiered on 16 February 2021 on ProSieben. Ruth Moschner and Rea Garvey returned to the panel after one season hiatus, replacing Bülent Ceylan and Sonja Zietlow. Matthias Opdenhövel also returned as host.

On 23 March 2021, the Dinosaurier (singer Sasha) was declared the winner and the Leopard (singer Cassandra Steen) was the runner-up.

Panelists and host

Matthias Opdenhövel returned as host. In August 2020, it was announced that Ruth Moschner and Rea Garvey, would be returning after one season hiatus.

As in previous seasons, a spin-off show named The Masked Singer - red. Special was aired after each live episode, hosted by Viviane Geppert (episodes 1, 3–4, 6) and Annemarie Carpendale (episodes 2, 5).

Guest panelists
Various guest panelists appeared as the third judge in the judging panel for one episode. These guest panelists included:

Contestants
Like in the previous seasons, the fourth season will include 10 contestants. On 26 January 2021, the first three contestants were revealed. Since 5 February 2021 until 11 February 2021, every day one new costume was revealed.

Episodes

Week 1 (16 February)

Week 2 (23 February)

Week 3 (2 March)

Week 4 (9 March)

Week 5 (16 March) – Semi-final

Week 6 (23 March) – Final
 Group number: "Fix You" by Coldplay

Round One

Round Two

Round Three

Reception

Ratings

References

External links
 

2021 German television seasons
The Masked Singer (German TV series)